Lobão is a former civil parish in the municipality of Santa Maria da Feira, Portugal. In 2013, the parish merged into the new parish Lobão, Gião, Louredo e Guisande. It has a population of 5,761 inhabitants and a total area of 7.91 km2.

Origin of the name

The toponym of the name is a personal name, it was named in 906 with Lupon and in 967 as Lubon.  It is derived from Lupu and with a suffix -one  It exists on a document in the year 1055 which mentioned a settlement as Lopone.

Economy

Its principal economical activities are civil construction, iron, wood, textile, metallurgy and a few others, the commercial, services and agriculture dominates the remainder of the parish's economy.

References

Former parishes of Santa Maria da Feira